During the 1998–99 English football season, Stockport County F.C. competed in the Football League First Division.

Season summary
In the 1998–99 season, Stockport finished in 16th place, winning just 3 of their final 14 matches. A 5–0 defeat at relegated Oxford United on the final day signalled the end of Megson's time at Edgeley Park.

Final league table

Results
Stockport County's score comes first

Legend

Football League First Division

FA Cup

League Cup

Squad

References

Stockport County F.C. seasons
Stockport County